The 51st Annual TV Week Logie Awards was held on Sunday 3 May 2009 at the Crown Palladium in Melbourne, and broadcast on the Nine Network. The ceremony was hosted by Gretel Killeen, while the red carpet arrivals was hosted by Jules Lund, Shelley Craft, Lyndsey Rodrigues and Carson Kressley. The red carpet arrivals was watched by 1.7 million viewers, while the ceremony was watched by 1.57 million viewers.

Winners and nominees
In the tables below, winners are listed first and highlighted in bold.

Gold Logie

Acting/Presenting
{| class="wikitable" style="width:100%;"
|-
! style="width:25%;"| Most Popular Actor
! style="width:25%;"| Most Popular Actress
|-
| valign="top" |
Todd Lasance in Home and Away (Seven Network)
Gyton Grantley in Underbelly (Nine Network)
Mark Priestley in All Saints (Seven Network)
Ian Smith in Neighbours (Network Ten)
Erik Thomson in Packed to the Rafters (Seven Network)
| valign="top" |
Rebecca Gibney in Packed to the Rafters (Seven Network)
Jodi Gordon in Home and Away (Seven Network)
Simmone Jade Mackinnon in McLeod's Daughters (Nine Network)
Kate Ritchie in Home and Away (Seven Network)
Kat Stewart in Underbelly (Nine Network)
|-
! style="width:50%;"| Most Outstanding Actor in a Series
! style="width:50%;"| Most Outstanding Actress in a Series
|-
| valign="top" |
Gyton Grantley in Underbelly (Nine Network)
Dustin Clare in Satisfaction (Showcase)
Vince Colosimo in Underbelly (Nine Network)
Callan Mulvey in Rush (Network Ten)
Damian Walshe-Howling in Underbelly (Nine Network)
| valign="top" |
Kat Stewart in Underbelly (Nine Network)
Julia Blake in Bed of Roses (ABC1)
Rebecca Gibney in Packed to the Rafters (Seven Network)
Claire van der Boom in Rush (Network Ten)
Madeleine West in Satisfaction (Showcase)
|-
! style="width:50%;"| Most Popular New Male Talent
! style="width:50%;"| Most Popular New Female Talent
|-
| valign="top" |Hugh Sheridan in Packed to the Rafters (Seven Network)Dean Geyer in Neighbours (Network Ten)
George Houvardas in Packed to the Rafters (Seven Network)
Matt Lee in So You Think You Can Dance Australia (Network Ten)
Jordan Rodrigues in Home and Away (Seven Network)
| valign="top" |Jessica Marais in Packed to the Rafters (Seven Network)Kirsty Lee Allan in Sea Patrol (Nine Network)
Rebecca Breeds in Home and Away (Seven Network)
Ricki-Lee Coulter in Australian Idol (Network Ten)
Margot Robbie in Neighbours (Network Ten)
|-
! style="width:50%;"| Most Outstanding New Talent
! style="width:50%;"| Most Popular Presenter
|-
| valign="top" |Jessica Marais in Packed to the Rafters (Seven Network)Lauren Clair in Underbelly (Nine Network)
Hanna Mangan-Lawrence in Bed of Roses (ABC1)
Hugh Sheridan in Packed to the Rafters (Seven Network)
Ashley Zukerman in Rush (Network Ten)
| valign="top" |Rove McManus in Rove and Are You Smarter Than a 5th Grader? (Network Ten)Natalie Bassingthwaighte in So You Think You Can Dance Australia (Network Ten)
Andrew Denton in Enough Rope (ABC1)
Grant Denyer in It Takes Two and Australia's Got Talent (Seven Network)
Adam Hills in Spicks and Specks (ABC1)
|}

Most Popular Programs

Most Outstanding Programs

Performers
Jessica Mauboy – "Been Waiting"
Natalie Bassingthwaighte – "1000 Stars"
Tom Burlinson – "Unforgettable"
Annie Lennox – "There Must Be an Angel (Playing with My Heart)"

Hall of Fame
Bill Collins became the 26th inductee into the TV Week Logies Hall of Fame.

Multiple nominations and awards

The following shows received multiple nominations.11 nominations: Packed to the Rafters9 nominations: Underbelly 7 nominations:  Home and Away5 nominations:  Neighbours3 nominations:  McLeod's Daughters and Rove2 nominations:  All Saints

The following shows received multiple awards.6 awards: Packed to the Rafters3 awards: Underbelly 2 awards:' Rove''

References

External links
 

2009
2009 television awards
2009 in Australian television
2009 awards in Australia